Fredrik Nyström (17 July 1880 – 13 February 1967) was a Swedish sports shooter. He competed in two events at the 1912 Summer Olympics.

References

External links
 

1880 births
1967 deaths
Swedish male sport shooters
Olympic shooters of Sweden
Shooters at the 1912 Summer Olympics
Sportspeople from Gotland County